Marek Piotr Cholewa (born July 1, 1963) is a former Polish ice hockey player. He played for the Poland men's national ice hockey team at the 1984 Winter Olympics in Sarajevo, the 1988 Winter Olympics in Calgary, and the 1992 Winter Olympics in Albertville.

References

1963 births
Living people
Ice hockey players at the 1984 Winter Olympics
Ice hockey players at the 1988 Winter Olympics
Ice hockey players at the 1992 Winter Olympics
Olympic ice hockey players of Poland
People from Sosnowiec
Polish ice hockey defencemen
Sportspeople from Silesian Voivodeship
TH Unia Oświęcim players